Outstandingly (March 25, 1982 – October 10, 2003) was an American Thoroughbred racehorse who was voted an Eclipse Award as the American Champion Two-Year-Old Filly of 1984.

Background
Bred and raced by Louis and Patrice Wolfson's Harbor View Farm, Outstandingly was trained by U.S. Racing Hall of Fame inductees Pancho Martin and Laz Barrera.

Racing career
Racing in California at age two, Outstandingly won the Grade 1 Hollywood Starlet Stakes followed by the first running of the Breeders' Cup Juvenile Fillies hosted by Hollywood Park Racetrack when Fran's Valentine was disqualified. Her performances set an earnings record for two-year-old fillies of $867872.

Outstandingly won only once in seven starts as a three-year-old but came back at age four in 1986 with five wins under new trainer Laz Barrera, two of which were in graded stakes races. At age five she made two starts, winning once and was then retired to broodmare duty.

Breeding record
In foal to Caro, Outstandingly was sold by the Wolfsons in November 1988 at the Fasig-Tipton sale. She drew the auction's highest price at US$1,150,000, paid by Darley Stud. As a broodmare, the top runner among her foals was her daughter Sensation (b. 1993) who in 1996 won the Prix de Bagatelle and Prix de Sandringham in France, and the Falmouth Stakes in England for owner Sheikh Maktoum Al Maktoum.

Reported to be suffering from chronic laminitis, on October 10, 2003 the 21-year-old Outstandingly was humanely euthanized at Gainsborough Farm near Lexington, Kentucky.

References

1982 racehorse births
2003 racehorse deaths
Racehorses bred in Kentucky
Racehorses trained in the United States
Breeders' Cup Juvenile Fillies winners
Eclipse Award winners
Thoroughbred family 1-x